Hany Abu-Assad (born 11 October 1961) is a Palestinian-Dutch film director. He has received two Academy Award nominations: in 2006 for his film Paradise Now, and again in 2013 for his film Omar.

Early life

Abu-Assad was born to a Palestinian Muslim family, in the city of Nazareth, Israel, in 1961. He immigrated to the Netherlands in 1981, where he studied aerodynamics in Haarlem and worked as an airplane engineer for several years. 
Abu-Assad was inspired after watching a film by Michel Khleifi to pursue a career in cinema. Abu-Assad initially started as a TV producer working on commissions for Channel 4 and the BBC. He founded Ayloul Film Productions in 1990 with the Palestinian film-maker Rashid Masharawi.

Film career

In 1992, Abu-Assad wrote and directed his first short film, Paper House which was made for NOS Dutch television and won several international awards at film festivals in Paris and Jerusalem.

In 1998, he directed his first film, Het 14de kippetje (The Fourteenth Chick), from a script by writer Arnon Grunberg. Later films include the documentary Nazareth 2000 (2000) and the feature film Rana's Wedding (2002).

In 2002, Ford Transit was nominated for the Ophir Award in the documentary category.

In 2006, his film Paradise Now won the Golden Globe Award for Best Foreign Language Film, and received an Oscar-nomination in the same category. In 2005 Paradise Now won the Golden Calf for Best Feature Film at the Netherlands Film Festival.

His 2013 film Omar was screened in the Un Certain Regard section at the 2013 Cannes Film Festival where it won the Jury Prize. In 2014, Omar was the Palestinian entry for the Best Foreign Language Film at the 86th Academy Awards, and was nominated for the award. The film also won the award for Best Film at the Asia Pacific Screen Awards.

In 2014, Abu-Assad was invited to join the Academy of Motion Picture Arts and Sciences.

In 2018, Abu-Assad joined the film jury for ShortCutz Amsterdam, an annual film festival promoting short films in Amsterdam.

Filmography

 Paper House  (1992, short film) - Director
 Curfew (1993) - Producer
 The 13th (1997, short film) - Director
 The Fourteenth Chick (1998) - Director
 Rana's Wedding (2002) - Director
 Paradise Now (2005) - Director
 The Courier (2012) - Director
 Omar (2013)
 The Idol (2015)
 The Mountain Between Us (2017)
 Huda's Salon (2021)

Documentaries
 Dar 0 Dour (1990) - Producer
 Long Days in Gaza (1991) - Producer
 De Arabieren van 2001 (1999) - Director
 Het Spijkerkwartier (2000) - Director
 Nazareth 2000 (2000) - Director
 Ford Transit (2002) - Director

See also
 List of Palestinian submissions for the Academy Award for Best Foreign Language Film

References

Further reading
Mendes, AC (2015). “Walled in/walled out in the West Bank: Performing Separation Walls in Hany Abu-Assad’s Omar”, Transnational Cinemas, 6.2, 123–136.

External links

"It was a joke I was even nominated"  The Guardian
"I risked my life to make this movie" The Telegraph
"Ticket to Paradise?" Christianity Today

1961 births
Living people
Dutch film directors
Dutch people of Palestinian descent
European Film Award for Best Screenwriter winners
Israeli film directors
Palestinian film directors
People from Nazareth